Troy Crowder (born May 3, 1968) is a Canadian former professional ice hockey right winger who played parts of seven seasons in the National Hockey League with the New Jersey Devils, Detroit Red Wings, Los Angeles Kings, and Vancouver Canucks from 1987–88 to 1996–97.

Crowder was born in Sudbury, Ontario. He was drafted 108th overall by the Devils in the 1986 NHL Entry Draft. He compiled 433 career penalty minutes in 150 NHL games played. He also scored nine goals and sixteen points.

In 2022, he was criminally convicted of uttering a forged document in connection with a fraudulent insurance claim.

Politics
In June 2017, Crowder announced that he was seeking the Progressive Conservative Party of Ontario nomination in the provincial riding of Sudbury for the 2018 Ontario general elections. He was acclaimed as the candidate on June 29, 2017. Crowder placed second in the election, behind Ontario New Democratic Party candidate Jamie West.

Following his defeat in the provincial election, Crowder registered to run for mayor of Greater Sudbury in the 2018 municipal election. He finished fifth in that race.

Insurance Fraud
In 2019, a boathouse at Crowder's cottage collapsed due to snow, destroying a fridge and a cedar-strip canoe inside. He submitted a form to his insurance company, ostensibly signed by his estranged wife, removing her from the insurance policy. It was later revealed that his wife's signature had been forged. Months later, Crowder obtained an estimate for a contractor to demolish the boathouse. He then submitted that document to his insurance company, including a cheque number for a payment that had never been made, claiming reimbursement for work that had never been completed. Relying on Crowder's submissions, his insurer directed three cheques to him personally: $11,074 for the demolition work, which he had done himself with some assistance; $6,750 for the loss of the cedar-strip canoe and fridge; and $84,185.01 for the loss of the boathouse.

On December 14, 2022, Crowder pleaded guilty to knowingly submitting a forged document as if it was genuine. He received an eight-month conditional sentence, the first four of which being house arrest, and a one-year probation order. In exchange for the guilty plea, four other fraud-related charges were withdrawn by the Crown prosecutor. Crowder was also required to pay his estranged wife $45,467.50, representing her half of the insurance proceeds. In addition, he was required to reimburse his insurer $11,074 for the fraudulent invoice.

Career statistics

Electoral results

References

1968 births
Living people
Belleville Bulls players
Calgary Flames executives
Canadian ice hockey right wingers
Detroit Red Wings players
Hamilton Steelhawks players
Hershey Bears players
Ice hockey people from Ontario
Los Angeles Kings players
New Jersey Devils players
North Bay Centennials players
Sportspeople from Greater Sudbury
Syracuse Crunch players
Utica Devils players
Vancouver Canucks players
Los Angeles Blades players
New Jersey Devils draft picks
Progressive Conservative Party of Ontario candidates in Ontario provincial elections
Canadian sportsperson-politicians